Giuseppe Pirrone (born 13 May 1986) is an Italian professional footballer who plays for Messina mainly as a midfielder.

Club career 
Pirrone kicked off his career with Folgore of fourth tier in 2004. In the following year, he was transferred to Ragusa. After having a long stint with  Manfredonia , he joined Trapani in 2010, making 108 appearances in the process.

In July 2014, Pirrone penned a two year contract with Ascoli. He scored his first goal against Reggiana.

References

External links 
 
 

1986 births
Living people
Association football midfielders
Italian footballers
Trapani Calcio players
Ascoli Calcio 1898 F.C. players
Serie C players
Serie B players
People from Alcamo